Sadayoshi (written: 定義, 定良 or 貞義) is a masculine Japanese given name. Notable people with the name include:

, Japanese philosopher, writer and critic
, Japanese baseball manager
, Japanese field hockey player
, Japanese samurai
, Japanese academic
, Imperial Japanese Navy admiral

Japanese masculine given names